Mount Roth is a rock peak (870 m) located 3 nautical miles (6 km) east of Mount Justman in the northeast corner of Gabbro Hills, near the edge of the Ross Ice Shelf. Discovered and photographed by the Byrd Antarctic Expedition (1928–30) and named for Benjamin Roth, mechanic and U.S. Army representative on that expedition.

References
 

Mountains of the Ross Dependency
Dufek Coast